"Deadwood" is the first episode of the first season of the HBO original series of the same name. The episode was written by David Milch and directed by Walter Hill. It first aired on March 21, 2004.

Hill won the Emmy Award for Outstanding Directing for the episode, and Milch was nominated for an Emmy Award for Outstanding Writing.

Plot

Seth Bullock, a Montana Territory marshal, watches over inmate Clell Watson, a man sentenced to death for stealing a horse.  Lamenting his misfortune, Watson mentions that he, like Bullock, was headed to Deadwood, a camp on Indian land in the Dakota Territory.  While Watson seeks to make his fortune prospecting in the gold-rich region, Bullock aspires to open a hardware store there with his business partner, Sol Star.

Watson attempts to make a deal with Bullock to secure his release, claiming to know of easy opportunities for thievery along the way to Deadwood, but his pleas are cut short by Star, who arrives informing Bullock that the owner of the stolen horse has gathered together a drunken mob.  Rather than turn Watson over to the angry mob, Bullock takes him out to face them and publicly hangs him on the front porch, afterward writing down Watson's last words and giving them, along with his marshal's badge, to a member of the mob to convey them to Watson's sister.

Upon arrival in Deadwood with a wagon full of hardware goods, Star and Bullock rent a vacant lot from Dan Dority, who tells them that payment is due every morning to Al Swearengen, the proprietor of the Gem Saloon, a local brothel.

At the Gem, Swearengen converses with Whitney Ellsworth, a local prospector, when they discover that Trixie, one of the prostitutes, has shot a customer in the head after he became abusive.  The customer survives for twenty minutes, but dies shortly after the arrival of Doc Cochran.  Swearengen ruthlessly beats Trixie, furious at the possible effect of a customer's death on his business and reputation.  Meanwhile, Cochran and Johnny Burns deliver the corpse to Mr. Wu, an associate of Swearengen's and leader of Deadwood's Chinese community, who feeds it to his pigs.

Wild Bill Hickok, a famous gunslinger, arrives in Deadwood, along with his companions Charlie Utter and Calamity Jane.  During a delay on the road, Jane encounters a Norwegian family returning home to Minnesota.  One of the three Norwegian children, Sofia Metz, smiles at Jane as they pass.

As Jane tends to the stock, Hickok and Utter check into E. B. Farnum's Grand Central Hotel and then visit Tom Nuttall's No. 10 Saloon.  Nuttall and A. W. Merrick, editor of the local newspaper The Deadwood Pioneer, are noticeably impressed to meet the famous Hickok, but Jack McCall, a man at one of the poker tables, whispers to his fellow players that he is not impressed.  As Hickok plays poker, Utter and Nuttall negotiate a fee for Hickok's regular appearance in the saloon.

Farnum reports Hickok's arrival to Swearengen, who is annoyed by the complication of having a famous former lawman in the camp.  Brom Garret, a wealthy aspiring prospector from New York City, arrives at the Gem.  Swearengen dispatches Farnum to collect Tim Driscoll, the owner of a nearby gold claim eyed by Garret.  The team of Farnum, Driscoll, and Swearengen con Garret to purchase Driscoll's claim for $14,000.  Driscoll goes beyond the scripted con, and works Garret up to pay $20,000.  As Driscoll is heavily indebted to the Gem, Swearengen pockets the money and later has Dority stab Driscoll to death in Farnum's hotel, possibly because of Driscoll's jeopardizing Swearengen's hopes of future further fleecing of the tenderfoot Garret.

Star and Bullock hire Reverend Smith, the local pastor, to watch their goods as they explore the camp. Star and Bullock run into Ned Mason, a disoriented man who claims to have witnessed the massacre of a white family with two children by Sioux along the road to Spearfish, where the Norwegian family were headed. Bullock takes him to Nuttall's saloon, where he forces him to recount the story.  Despite Bullock's urging to return to the scene to check for the third Norwegian child, Mason is reluctant, worried for his own safety.  Hickok, who had remained at the saloon at poker, offers to ride with them as protection.  As the search party leaves the saloon, Bullock confides to Hickok his suspicions about Mason's story.

News of the departing party reaches Swearengen, who is furious at the potential disruption to his business and resorts to offering free liquor and prostitutes at half price in an effort to keep his customers from joining the search, counseling them to wait until the following day.  Upon arrival at the scene, the search party finds a ransacked wagon and the mutilated corpses of the Metz family. Bullock searches the area and finds young Sofia Metz, wounded but alive, lying under a bush nearby.

After dropping Sofia off with Doc Cochran, Bullock and Hickok confront Mason on the camp thoroughfare, stating that there was too much ransacking at the scene to be consistent with an Indian attack and that it was more likely a staged robbery.  Mason tries to defend himself, arguing that he never would have returned to camp had he been involved, but Hickok says that he, like Mason, had often felt the need for sex and gambling after a kill. Cornered, Mason attempts to attack but is outdrawn and shot dead by Hickok and Bullock. From his window on the second floor of the Gem, Swearengen watches the events unfold until Trixie enters and, despite the brutal beating earlier, climbs into bed with him.

Production

Development and casting
Creator David Milch pitched to HBO a series set in Ancient Rome, exploring the introduction of law and order to a civilization. When HBO executives Chris Albrecht and Carolyn Strauss suggested that he change his setting due to the network already having Rome in development, Milch transposed the themes to 1800s Deadwood. In a later interview, Milch reflected, "It had seemed to me that the symbol of the cross as the organizing principle of behavior could be transliterated to the symbol of the badge, as a similar organizing principle."
Milch wrote the role of Al Swearengen with Ed O'Neill in mind, having worked with him on the CBS series Big Apple, but executives were reluctant to build a series around an actor still associated with his lead role in Married... with Children. Powers Boothe was then cast in the role but was forced to withdraw due to illness, leading to the casting of Ian McShane. After Boothe recovered, he began playing Cy Tolliver on the series, a character introduced in the third episode of the first season.

Credits
The credited starring cast consists of Timothy Olyphant (Seth Bullock), Ian McShane (Al Swearengen), Molly Parker (Alma Garret), Jim Beaver (Whitney Ellsworth), Brad Dourif (Doc Cochran), John Hawkes (Sol Star), Paula Malcomson (Trixie), Leon Rippy (Tom Nuttall), William Sanderson (E. B. Farnum), Robin Weigert (Calamity Jane), W. Earl Brown (Dan Dority), Dayton Callie (Charlie Utter), and Keith Carradine (Wild Bill Hickok).

Guest stars

 Jeffrey Jones as A. W. Merrick
 Timothy Omundson as Brom Garret
 Garret Dillahunt as Jack McCall
 Ray McKinnon as Reverend Smith
 Sean Bridgers as Johnny Burns
 Geri Jewell as Jewel

 Keone Young as Mr. Wu
 Jamie McShane as Ned Mason
 Dan Hildebrand as Tim Driscoll
 Michael Hagerty as Loud Wagoneer
 Christopher Darga as Byron Sampson
 James Parks as Clell Watson

Awards
Director Walter Hill won the Primetime Emmy Award for Outstanding Directing for a Drama Series for "Deadwood", while writer David Milch received a Primetime Emmy Award for Outstanding Writing for a Drama Series nomination. Hill also won the Directors Guild of America Award for Outstanding Directing – Drama Series.

References

External links
 "Deadwood" at HBO.com
 

Deadwood (TV series)
American television series premieres
2004 American television episodes
Emmy Award-winning episodes